Tomoya Tsuboi is a Japanese boxer. He participated at the 2021 AIBA World Boxing Championships, being awarded the gold medal in the bantamweight event. Tsuboi and Sewon Okazawa were the first Japanese gold medal winners at the 2021 AIBA World Boxing Championships.

References

External links 

Living people
Place of birth missing (living people)
Year of birth missing (living people)
Japanese male boxers
Bantamweight boxers
Japan Ground Self-Defense Force personnel
AIBA World Boxing Championships medalists
Nihon University alumni
People from Hamamatsu
Boxers at the 2018 Asian Games